Wetaskiwin-Camrose was a provincial electoral district in Alberta, Canada, mandated to return a single member to the Legislative Assembly of Alberta using first past the post method of voting from 1993 to 2019.

History
The district was created in the 1993 boundary re-distribution from the Wetaskiwin-Leduc and Camrose districts. It is located in rural central eastern Alberta. It includes its namesakes Wetaskiwin and Camrose as well as the town of Millet and the Samson 137 and Montana 139 Indian reserves.

The district and its antecedents had been favourable to electing Progressive Conservative candidates for the past few decades, however, this changed in the 2015 Alberta general election when New Democratic Bruce Hinkley who won his first term.

The 2010 electoral boundary re-distribution saw a portion of land lying east of the city of Camrose transferred in the Battle River-Wainwright electoral district.

The Wetaskiwin-Camrose electoral district was dissolved in the 2017 electoral boundary re-distribution, and portions of the district would form the newly created Camrose and Maskwacis-Wetaskiwin electoral districts.

Boundary history

Electoral history
The electoral district was created in the 1993 boundary redistribution. The election held that year saw incumbent Camrose MLA Ken Rostad run in the new electoral district. He picked up the new seat for the Progressive Conservative party facing a strong challenge from Liberal candidate Bob Prestage.

Rostad retired at dissolution of the assembly in 1997. His replacement in the legislature was Progressive Conservative candidate LeRoy Johnson. He won the district with a landslide to hold it for his party. He was re-elected to a second term in the 2001 general election with a bigger majority. He won a third term in office in 2004 and retired at the end of his third term in 2008. Progressive Conservative Verlyn Olson who was elected to his first term in the 2008 general election and second term in 2012, before losing to New Democratic Bruce Hinkley in the 2015 election.

Legislature results

1993 general election

1997 general election

2001 general election

2004 general election

2008 general election

2012 general election

2015 general election

Senate nominee results

2004 Senate nominee election district results

Voters had the option of selecting 4 Candidates on the Ballot

2012 Senate nominee election district results

Student Vote results

2004 election

On November 19, 2004, a Student Vote was conducted at participating Alberta schools to parallel the 2004 Alberta general election results. The vote was designed to educate students and simulate the electoral process for persons who have not yet reached the legal majority. The vote was conducted in 80 of the 83 provincial electoral districts with students voting for actual election candidates. Schools with a large student body that reside in another electoral district had the option to vote for candidates outside of the electoral district then where they were physically located.

2012 election

See also
List of Alberta provincial electoral districts
Camrose, Alberta a city in central Alberta
Wetaskiwin, Alberta a city in central Alberta

References

External links
Elections Alberta
The Legislative Assembly of Alberta

Former provincial electoral districts of Alberta
Camrose, Alberta
Wetaskiwin